Anna Lois White (2 November 1903 – 13 September 1984), known in the art world as Lois (pronounced Loyce) White, was a New Zealand painter of the modernist school. She taught at the Elam Art School of the University of Auckland from 1927 until 1963.

Early life
White was the youngest of four children of Auckland architect Arthur Herbert White and Annie White (Phillips).  Her maternal grandfather ran W. Phillips & Sons, an importer of prints and artists' materials.  She attended Epsom Girls' Grammar School from 1919 to 1922, excelling at all subjects, moving on to study at Elam in 1923.

Career
In 1927 she became a part-time tutor at Elam, teaching the junior drawing classes, while at the same time taking a part-time position teaching art at Takapuna Grammar School.  From 1934 she was full-time at Elam until her retirement in January 1963.

Her career as a painter continued in concurrently with her teaching career, being accepted as a full "Working Member" of the Auckland Society of Arts in 1931 and exhibiting regularly with the Society.

Lois was one of the founders of the New Group in 1948, a somewhat conservative group of artists concentrating on traditional form and draughtsmanship, somewhat in opposition to younger artists of the time who were pursuing modernist and abstract forms.  She continued to be viewed as a somewhat conservative artist, even in her own opinion, until her work was reappraised through solo exhibitions in 1977 and (after her death) 1994. Thematically, many of her works have been recognized as progressive social activism, including her painting 'Success', which shows a man waving a money bag over a hungry family, and her painting 'War Makers', exhibited between the World Wars, which shows prosperous older, powerful figures mocking a young soldier. According to Raymond Huber in the book 'Peace Warriors', Lois described 'War Makers' as intended to expose the injustice of an older generation engaging in war and sending the younger generation to kill and be killed.

References

Further reading
 Bell, Leonard: "A conversation with Lois White", Art New Zealand 18, Summer 1981 (full article is here) 
 Dunn, Michael: New Zealand Painting: a concise History. Auckland University Press, 2003, p 88–89, 112.
 Finlayson, Claire: This thing in the mirror: self portraits by New Zealand artists. Nelson N.Z. Craig Potton Publishing, 2004, p 108–110, 130.
 Green, Nicola: By the Waters of Babylon: The Art of A. Lois White. Auckland, N.Z.: Auckland City Art Gallery: David Bateman, 1993. 
 Green, Nicola: "Giotto meets Deco: A New Perspective on A. Lois White", Art New Zealand 60, Spring 1991.
 King, Julkie: "By the Waters of Babylon: The Art of A. Lois White", Art New Zealand 73, Summer 1994–95.

External links
 Artworks by Lois White in the collection of the Museum of New Zealand Te Papa Tongarewa

1903 births
1984 deaths
Elam Art School alumni
People educated at Epsom Girls' Grammar School
20th-century New Zealand painters